Euphaedra ferruginea, the ferruginous orange forester, is a butterfly in the family Nymphalidae. It is found in eastern Nigeria and Cameroon. The habitat consists of forests.

Similar species
Other members of the Euphaedra eleus species group q.v.

Gallery

References

Butterflies described in 1886
ferruginea
Butterflies of Africa
Taxa named by Otto Staudinger